is a train station in Fukuyama, Hiroshima Prefecture, Japan, with automatic vending machines.

Timeline of notable history 
 July 21, 1914 - at the time of opening of the light railway.
 June 26, 1926 - Renamed to the light railway train.

See also 
 West Japan Railway Company
 Fukuen Line

Adjacent stations 

|-
!colspan=5|JR West

References 

Railway stations in Hiroshima Prefecture
Railway stations in Japan opened in 1914